Blake Slatkin (born October 16, 1997) is a record producer and songwriter. He is best known for his work with Justin Bieber, Lil Nas X, Lizzo, The Kid Laroi, Gracie Abrams, Sam Smith, and 24kGoldn. Slatkin has charted seven Top 10 Billboard Hot 100 songs, with four reaching No. 1.

Career 
Slatkin was born and raised in Los Angeles, California and began playing guitar at 10 years old. He performed in bands and sang at venues around Los Angeles before discovering a career in production. At 16 he began an internship with producer Benny Blanco before moving to New York City to attend New York University.

As a student at NYU, Slatkin worked with Gracie Abrams and Omar Apollo as a producer and songwriter and served as an executive producer on both of their debut projects. Upon dropping out of NYU, Slatkin relocated to Los Angeles to work in music full time.

Slatkin worked with longtime collaborators The Kid Laroi, Lil Nas X, Omar Fedi, and 24kGoldn during the 2020 COVID-19 Pandemic. He had his first No. 1 on the Billboard Hot 100 that year with 24kGoldn’s “Mood” feat. Iann Dior. The song topped the chart for eight weeks. That year he also produced “Without You” by The Kid Laroi, followed by The Kid Laroi and Justin Bieber’s “Stay,” which also peaked at No. 1 on the Billboard Hot 100, along with the Billboard Global 200 and spent seven weeks at the top of the chart, becoming the second longest running song of all-time on the chart as well as spend the most weeks at No. 1 in pop radio history.

At the 64th Annual GRAMMY Awards, Slatkin earned a nomination for Album of the Year for his work as producer on Lil Nas X’s ‘Montero’ and songwriter  on the album’s song, “That’s What I Want.” 

In 2021, Slatkin was added to Variety’s annual Hitmakers of the Year list. Forbes included him in their annual 30 Under 30 List in 2022  and was a Pop Song of the Year honoree at the 2022 BMI Pop Awards for his work on “Mood”, and was nominated at the 2022 iHeartRadio Music Awards for Producer of the Year.

Notable credits

References 

1997 births
Living people
Record producers from Los Angeles
New York University alumni
American male songwriters